Guapa is an album released by the band La Oreja de Van Gogh

Guapa (pretty) may also refer to:

 "Guapa" (song), by Diego Torres
 "Guapa", a song by Becky G from Esquemas
 "Guapa", a song by RAF Carmona
 "Guapas", a song by Bandana
 Guapa (novel), first novel by writer Saleem Haddad
 Guapas, an Argentine telenovela
 Gloria Piedimonte, Italian singer and actress, known as "La guapa"